Baptiste Reynet (born 28 October 1990) is a French professional footballer who plays as a goalkeeper for Dijon.

Career
Reynet was born in Romans.

He joined Dijon FCO in May 2011 after spending three years with Martigues whom he made over 50 appearances with. He made his club debut with Dijon on 13 August 2011 in a 2–0 league defeat to Toulouse.

Reynet was loaned back to Dijon after one year in FC Lorient.

On 29 June 2018, Reynet joined Toulouse FC for four seasons.

On 24 June 2020, Reynet joined Nîmes Olympique for an undisclosed fee, reportedly around €500,000. He signed a two-year contract and chose to wear the number 30.

References

External links
 
 
 

Living people
1990 births
Association football goalkeepers
French footballers
FC Martigues players
Dijon FCO players
FC Lorient players
Toulouse FC players
Nîmes Olympique players
Ligue 1 players
Ligue 2 players
Championnat National 2 players
Championnat National 3 players
People from Romans-sur-Isère
Sportspeople from Drôme
Footballers from Auvergne-Rhône-Alpes